Maria Ferm is a Swedish politician. She served as Member of the Riksdag with the Green Party. After graduating from Malmö University in 2008, she served as spokesperson of the Young Greens until 2011. She served as the Green Party's house leader from 2014 to 2019.

References  

1985 births
Living people
21st-century Swedish women politicians
Malmö University alumni
Members of the Riksdag from the Green Party
Women members of the Riksdag
Politicians from Malmö
Members of the Riksdag 2010–2014
Members of the Riksdag 2014–2018
Members of the Riksdag 2018–2022